Patsy Jo Hilliard (b. ) is an African-American educator, education administrator, and the former mayor of East Point, Georgia. She was the first woman to be a member of the South San Francisco Unified School District and the first African-American woman mayor of East Point and the state of Georgia.

Early life and education
Hilliard, née Patsy Jo Morrison, was born in Denver, Colorado, to parents Elmer Dudley Morrison II and Jessie Morrison. In 1955, she and her future husband, Asa Grant Hilliard III, graduated from Manual High School. She continued her education at Los Angeles State College in 1956 while working as a playground supervisor for the LA school system. Hilliard graduated from San Francisco State University with a B.A. in interdisciplinary social sciences in 1976. In 2008, she was honored with an honorary doctorate from Sojourner–Douglass College.

Career
In 1964, Hilliard worked as a first grade teacher at Bright Functions School in Monrovia, Liberia as a volunteer for the American Women in Liberia organization. In 1975, Hillard was the first African-American women to work as a board member for the South San Francisco Unified School District.

In 1993, Hilliard became the first woman and African-American to be elected as mayor in the city of East Point, Georgia and in the state of Georgia. Hilliard served as mayor of East Point until 2006, longer than any other mayor of that town. Hilliard hosted the television talk show "In the Know with Patsy Jo" in 2007. She is now the CEO of Waset Educational Production Company, which she co-founded with her husband, and she runs Ancient African Study Tours, which offers educational tours to Egypt.

Hilliard has collaborated with a variety of groups throughout the course of her career, including the East Point Business Association, the Superintendents Advisory Board of the Fulton County School District, the Atlanta Airport Rotary Club, the Atlanta High Museum of Art, and the DeYoung Museum of Art. She has served as President of the Atlanta chapter of Links, Inc. and the Atlanta Alumnae chapter of Delta Sigma Theta sorority She has also served on the Executive Board of the Atlanta chapter of the NAACP.

Honors
Hilliard has earned many honors, including the SCLC's Drum Major for Justice Medal, the Delta Sigma Theta Sorority's Torch Award, and Alpha Kappa Alpha's Public Service Award. She has been inducted into the Atlanta Business League Women's Hall of Fame and has been named one of the 100 Most Influential Black Women over the last six years. Hilliard was selected as being one of the six mayors from the United States to join the fourth Japan-US Mayors Friendship Exchange Conference.

Personal life
Hillard was married to Asa Grant Hillard III, an African American historian, until his death in 2007. They shared four children (Asa IV, Robi, Patricia and Hakim) and eight grandchildren (Maia, Terry, T'Shaka, Foluke, Xavier, Dayo, Shaidah and Asa Pearl).

Citations

Works cited 
 
 
 
 

1937 births
20th-century African-American women
20th-century African-American people
21st-century American women
African-American educators
African-American mayors in Georgia (U.S. state)
Living people
21st-century African-American women
21st-century African-American people